South China AA will seek to win the Hong Kong First Division League championship after they failed to win it last year as Kitchee won. South China are competing in the First Division League, Senior Shield, FA Cup, and League Cup.

Key events 
17 June 2011: Chairman Steven Lo announced that Chiu Chun Kit and Poon Yiu Cheuk have transferred to Citizen and Sham Shui Po respectively.
28 June 2011: Chairman Steven Lo announced that South China appointed Ján Kocian as their new head coach. Ex-caretaker Chan Ho Yin has switched to be assistant coach.
30 June 2011: South China announced that 4 youth team players, Kot Cho Wai, Li Yim Lam, Cheung Chun Hei and Chan Pak Hang, are promoted to the first team.
21 July 2011: Chairman Steven Lo announced that South China has sealed the deal of Brazilian forward Leonel Alvim Neto.
26 July 2011: Chairman Steven Lo announced that South China has signed Canadian left back Paris Nakajima-Farran, who is also a Japanese descent.
21 August 2011: Leonel Alvim Neto leaves the club due to the uselessness for the team.
26 August 2011: Chairman Steven Lo announced that South China has signed Curacaoan forward Dyron Daal.
25 November 2011: South China and English Premier League club Tottenham Hotspur announced the renewal of their Club Partnership at a press conference held on 25 November 2011 at Jumbo Kingdom, Hong Kong.
29 December 2011: Chairman Steven Lo announced that 3 new players would join the club, including 2 Brazilian, Dhiego de Souza Martins and João Emir Porto Pereira, who were suggested by Brazilian club Internacional. The third one is Yeo Jeehoon, a South Korean.
7 January 2012: Chairman Steven Lo announced that Dyron Daal and Paris Nakajima-Farran, who joined the club at the beginning of the season, are released by the club.
23 January 2012: Serbian forward Mateja Kežman played for South China in 2012 Asian Challenge Cup after he announced to end his footballer career on 26 January in Hong Kong.

Player

First Team squad 
As of 26 August 2011.

On loan

Transfers

In

Out

Stats

Squad stats

Top scorers

Disciplinary record

Staff

Competitions

Overall

First Division League

Classification

Results summary

Results by round

Fixtures and results

Friendly

2012 Asian Challenge Cup

First Division League

Senior Challenge Shield

Quarter-final

Semi-final

Final

References 

South China AA seasons
South

zh:南華足球隊2011/12賽季